HMS Viper was launched at Cowes in 1805 as the mercantile schooner Princess Charlotte. The Royal Navy purchased her in 1807. Lieutenant William Towning commissioned her. On 9 (or 18) February 1809 she sailed from Cadiz for Gibraltar. She never arrived and was presumed to have foundered with all hands. 

She was carrying as a passenger Robert Arbuthnot, the former Chief Secretary in Ceylon.

Citations and references
Citations

References
 
  

1805 ships
Age of Sail merchant ships of England
Schooners of the Royal Navy
Maritime incidents in 1809
Missing ships
Warships lost with all hands